CamelPhat are an English DJ and production duo, consisting of Dave Whelan and Mike Di Scala, formed in Liverpool in 2004. They are best known for the 2017 single "Cola", which peaked at number 3 in the UK Dance Chart, and at number 18 in the UK Singles Chart. The single was a collaboration with UK dance act Elderbrook and was released on Defected Records.

Biography
Dave Whelan and Mike Di Scala met each other in Liverpool record shop 3 Beat Records and were both disc jockeys at nightclubs in the city. Di Scala had previously released music as a member of Rezonance Q and Ultrabeat and also as a solo artist. Dave Whelan hosted his own Jubilee club night since 2004 and the two were resident DJs at Society nightclub. They began producing music together as members of The Chosen Few, along with Les Calvert, and the trio also managed the Adhesive record label as a sublabel of  All Around the World. The Chosen Few released a cover of the Tears for Fears song "Everybody Wants to Rule the World" (Adhesive, 2004) and a remix of the original song appeared on Tears Roll Down (Greatest Hits 82–92).

As a duo Whelan and Di Scala released several remixes as under various names such as The Bassline Hustlers, Men from Mars and Da Mode. Using the name Pawn Shop, they released a single "Shot Away" (All Around the World, 2006), based on a sample of "Gimme Shelter" by The Rolling Stones, which peaked at number 100 on the UK Singles Chart. Following this, they released several singles as Whelan & Di Scala on various labels, including their own label Bachelor Pad Recordings. The two DJs also released music using other aliases such as Wheels & Disco, Mancini and Shake n' Jack. From 2008 to 2014, Dave Whelan was also a radio presenter on Juice FM.

In 2010, they released their first recordings as CamelPhat on their own label Vice Records. As CamelPhat, the duo initially wore wrestling masks to conceal their identity because they "just wanted the people to judge the music and not us". In 2011, Dave Whelan and Mike Di Scala became owners of a Liverpool nightclub Mansion. The duo released numerous singles and EPs on various record labels and some CamelPhat songs appeared on the Ultratop charts in Belgium, such as "The Act" (Spinnin' Deep, 2014),  "Paradigm" featuring A*M*E (Axtone, 2015), "Constellations" (Spinnin' Deep, 2015), "Make 'Em Dance" from Light Night EP (Suara, 2016) and "Hangin' Out with Charlie" from Hangin' with Charlie EP (Suara, 2017).

The duo's collaboration with Elderbrook on "Cola" (Defected, 2017) was an international hit single which peaked at number one on the US Billboard Dance Club Songs chart and was nominated for Best Dance Recording at the 60th Annual Grammy Awards. They released further singles and EPs and had other hit singles with "Panic Room" (Loudmouth Music, 2018), a collaboration with Au/Ra and "Breathe" (Pryda Presents, 2018), a collaboration with Cristoph featuring Jem Cooke. In December 2018, CamelPhat signed to RCA Records. In June 2019, they released "Be Someone", a collaboration with Jake Bugg, as the lead single from their upcoming debut album.

Discography

Studio albums

Extended plays
Global (2010) 
Made in Italy (2010) 
Kill the VIP (2010)
Vice Summer 2011 (2011) 
Outta Body (2012)
Watergate (2012)
One Hump or Two (2012)
Art of Work (2015)
Get Sick (2015)
Light Night (2016)
Higher (2016)
Deets (2017)
Hangin' with Charlie (2017)
Gypsy King (2017)
Monsters (2017)
House Dawgs (2017)
Bang 2 Drum (2017) 
Revisited (2017)
Crystal Clear (2019)

Singles

Remixes

Production and songwriting credits

Music videos

Awards and nominations

AIM Awards

|-
| 2018
| CamelPhat
| Most Played New Independent Act
|

DJ Awards

|-
| 2016
| CamelPhat
| Breakthrough
| 
|-
| 2017
| "Cola" (with Elderbrook)
| Track of the Season
| 
|-
| 2018
| CamelPhat
| House Artist
| 
|-
| 2019
| CamelPhat
| Tech House
|

DJ Mag Best of British Awards

|-
| 2018
| CamelPhat
| Best Group
|

Grammy Awards

|-
| 2018
| "Cola" (with Elderbrook)
| Best Dance Recording
|

International Dance Music Awards

|-
| 2018
| "Cola" (with Elderbrook)
| Best Song
| 
|-
| 2019
| "Panic Room" (with Au/Ra)
| Best Electronic Song
|

Ivor Novello Awards

|-
| 2018
| "Cola" (with Elderbrook)
| Best Contemporary Song
|

UK Music Video Awards

|-
| 2019
| "Be Someone" (with Jake Bugg)
| Best Dance Video - UK
|  
|-
| 2019
| "Be Someone" (with Jake Bugg)
| Best Editing in a Video
|

WDM Radio Awards

|-
| 2018
| "Cola" (with Elderbrook)
| Best Dancefloor Track
|

Notes

References

External links
 

DJs from Liverpool
House DJs
Electronic dance music DJs
English house music duos
Electronic dance music duos
Male musical duos
British record production teams
Record production duos
Spinnin' Records artists
Musical groups established in 2004
Musical groups from Liverpool